Lincoln, Nebraska is the home of the state capitol of Nebraska, the University of Nebraska and has history dating back to the mid 1800s.  A list of tourist attractions that  can be found within the city are as follows.

Arboretums/gardens

 Alice Abel Arboretum
 Hamann Rose Garden
 Joshua C. Turner Arboretum
 Maxwell Arboretum
 Sunken Gardens

Attractions

 Centennial Mall
 Downtown Lincoln
 Deer Springs Winery
 Governor's Mansion
 Historic Haymarket and West Haymarket
 Hyde Observatory
 James Arthur Vineyards
 Lincoln Children's Zoo
 Lux Center for the Arts
 Nebraska State Capitol
 P Street District

Event venues/arenas

 John Breslow Ice Hockey Center
 Haymarket Park
 Ice Box
 Lancaster Event Center
Lincoln Community Playhouse
 Pinewood Bowl Theater (in Pioneers Park)
 Pinnacle Bank Arena

Historic sites

 Fairview, home of William Jennings Bryan
 Robber's Cave
 Thomas P. Kennard House
 Wyuka Cemetery

Museums

 American Historical Society of Germans from Russia Museum
 Lincoln Children's Museum
 Midwestern African Museum of Art, Culture & Resource Center
 Museum of American Speed
 Museum of Nebraska History
 National Museum of Roller Skating (and the offices of USA Roller Sports)
 Nebraska High School Sports Hall of Fame

University of Nebraska–Lincoln

 Bob Devaney Sports Center
 Eisentrager Howard Gallery
 Great Plains Art Museum
 International Quilt Study Center & Museum
 Kawasaki Reading Room
 Kimball Recital Hall
 The Kruger Collection in the College of Architecture
 Lentz Collection for Asian Culture
 Lester F. Larsen Tractor Test & Power Museum
 Lied Center for Performing Arts and Johnny Carson Theater
 Love Library
 Mary Riepma Ross Media Arts Center, a.k.a. The Ross
 Memorial Stadium: Home of the Cornhuskers football team, built in 1923
 The Robert Hillestad Textiles Gallery
 Sheldon Museum of Art: built in the early 1960s, architect Philip Johnson
 UNL Botanical Garden & Arboretum (City Campus)
 UNL Botanical Garden & Arboretum (East Campus)
 UNL Dairy Store
 University of Nebraska State Museum (Morrill Hall) and Mueller Planetarium, Nebraska's only fulldome digital planetarium

References

Lincoln
Tourist attractions in Lincoln, Nebraska
Nebraska-related lists
Lincoln, Nebraska